Michael Wittmann (22 April 19148 August 1944) was a German Waffen-SS tank commander during the Second World War. He is known for his ambush of elements of the British 7th Armored Division during the Battle of Villers-Bocage on 13 June 1944. While in command of a Tiger I tank, Wittmann destroyed up to 14 tanks, 15 personnel carriers and two anti-tank guns within 15 minutes for the loss of his own tank. The news was disseminated by Nazi propaganda and added to Wittmann's reputation.

Wittmann became a cult figure after the war thanks to his accomplishments as a "panzer ace" (a highly decorated tank commander), part of the portrayal of the Waffen-SS in popular culture. Historians have mixed opinions about his tactical performance in battle. Some praised his actions at Villers-Bocage, while others found his abilities lacking, and the praise for his tank kills overstated. He is also known as the Black Baron.

Early life and World War II

Michael Wittmann was born in the village of Vogelthal, near Dietfurt in Bavaria's Upper Palatinate, on 22 April 1914. He enlisted in the German Army (Heer) in 1934 after the Nazi seizure of power. Wittmann joined the Schutzstaffel (SS) in October 1936 and was assigned to the regiment, later division, Leibstandarte SS Adolf Hitler (LSSAH) on 5 April 1937. A year later, he participated in the annexation of Austria, the occupation of Sudetenland, and joined the Nazi Party.

Eastern Front
Wittmann's unit was transferred to the Eastern Front in the spring of 1941 for Operation Barbarossa, the planned invasion of the Soviet Union. He was assigned to SS Panzer Regiment 1, a tank unit, where he commanded a StuG III assault gun/tank destroyer as well as a Panzer III medium tank. By 1943, he commanded a Tiger I tank, and had become a platoon leader in the heavy company by the time Operation Citadel and the Battle of Kursk took place. Attached to the LSSAH, Wittmann's platoon of four Tigers reinforced the division's reconnaissance battalion to screen the division's left flank. On their first day in battle at Kursk, Wittmann and his crew scored eight tanks and seven anti-tank guns destroyed.  At one point, his tank survived a collision with a burning T-34.

In November 1943, Wittmann, still serving in Leibstandarte’s heavy company, was involved in armored counterattacks against the Russians around Zhitomir. On their first day in action against the Soviets, Wittman’s crew destroyed ten T-34s and five anti-tank guns. “By early January 1944 his combined total of destroyed tanks would rise to sixty-six.”

On 14 January 1944, Wittmann was awarded the Knight's Cross of the Iron Cross. The presentation was made by his divisional commander, SS-Oberführer Theodor Wisch, who nominated him for the Knight's Cross of the Iron Cross with Oak Leaves. Wittmann was awarded the Oak Leaves on 30 January for the destruction of 117 tanks, making him the 380th member of the German armed forces to receive it. He received the award from Adolf Hitler, who presented it to him at the Wolf's Lair, his headquarters in Rastenburg, on 2 February 1944.

Normandy

In April 1944, the LSSAH's Tiger Company was transferred to SS Heavy Panzer Battalion 101. This battalion was assigned to the I SS Panzer Corps as a corps asset, and was never permanently attached to any division or regiment. Wittmann was appointed commander of the battalion's second company, and held the rank of SS-Obersturmführer. On 7 June, the day after the Allied Invasion of Normandy began, the battalion was ordered to move from Beauvais to Normandy. The move, covering 165 km (105 miles), took five days to complete.

Due to the Anglo-American advance south from Gold and Omaha Beaches, the German 352nd Infantry Division began to buckle. As the division withdrew south, it opened a 12 km (a 7.5-mile) gap in the front line near Caumont-l'Éventé. Sepp Dietrich, commander of 1st SS Panzer Corps, ordered Heavy SS-Panzer Battalion 101, his only reserve, to position itself behind the Panzer Lehr Division and SS Division Hitlerjugend. From this position, the battalion could protect the developing open left flank. Anticipating the importance the British would assign to the high ground near Villers-Bocage, Wittmann's company was positioned near the town. It arrived late on 12 June. Nominally composed of 12 tanks, his company was 50 per cent understrength due to losses and mechanical failures.

The next morning, lead elements of the British 7th Armoured Division entered Villers-Bocage. Their objective was to exploit the gap in the front line, seize Villers-Bocage, and capture the nearby ridge (Point 213) in an attempt to force a German withdrawal. Wittman had not expected them to arrive so soon and had no time to assemble his company. "Instead I had to act quickly, as I had to assume that the enemy had already spotted me and would destroy me where I stood." Having ordered the rest of the company to hold its ground, he set off with one tank.

At approximately 09:00, Wittmann's Tiger emerged from cover onto the main road, Route Nationale 175, and engaged the rearmost British tanks positioned on Point 213, destroying them. Wittmann then moved towards Villers-Bocage, engaging several transport vehicles parked along the roadside; the carriers burst into flames as their fuel tanks were ruptured by machine gun and high explosive fire. Moving into the eastern end of the town, he engaged several light tanks, followed by medium tanks. Alerted to Wittmann's actions, light tanks in the middle of the town quickly got off the road, while medium tanks were brought forward. Wittmann, meanwhile, had destroyed another British tank, two artillery observation post (OP) tanks, followed by a scout car and a half-track.

Accounts differ as to what happened next. Historians record that, after destroying the OP tanks, Wittmann duelled briefly without success with a Sherman Firefly before withdrawing. His Tiger is then reported to have continued eastwards to the outskirts of the town before being disabled by an anti-tank gun. However, Wittmann said his tank was disabled by an anti-tank gun in the town centre.

In less than 15 minutes, 13 or 14 tanks, two anti-tank guns, and 13 to 15 transport vehicles had been destroyed by Heavy SS-Panzer Battalion 101, the majority attributed to Wittmann. He played no further role in the Battle of Villers-Bocage. For his actions during the battle, Wittmann was promoted to SS-Hauptsturmführer, and awarded the Knight's Cross of the Iron Cross with Oak Leaves and Swords.

The German propaganda machine swiftly credited Wittmann, by then a household name in Germany, with all the British tanks destroyed at Villers-Bocage. He recorded a radio message on the evening of 13 June, describing the battle and claiming that later counter-attacks had destroyed a British armoured regiment and an infantry battalion. Doctored images were produced; three joined-together photographs, published in the German army magazine Signal, gave a false impression of the scale of destruction in the town. The propaganda campaign was given credence in Germany and abroad, leaving the British convinced that the Battle of Villers-Bocage had been a disaster. In fact, its results were less clear-cut. The Waffen-SS may have fought with distinction during the Battle of Kursk but could not match the army's success, hence Sepp Dietrich's attempts to manufacture a hero out of Wittmann.

Death

On 8 August 1944, Anglo-Canadian forces launched Operation Totalize. Under the cover of darkness, British and Canadian tanks and troops seized the tactically important high ground near the town of Saint-Aignan-de-Cramesnil. Here they paused, awaiting an aerial bombardment that would signal the next phase of the attack. Unaware of the reason the Allied forces had halted, SS Hitlerjugend Division Commander Kurt Meyer ordered a  counterattack to recapture the high ground.

Wittmann led a group of seven Tiger tanks from Heavy SS-Panzer Battalion 101, supported by additional tanks and infantry. His group of Tigers crossed open terrain towards the high ground. They were ambushed by Allied tanks from two sides. On the right or northeast, British tanks from "A" Squadron 1st Northamptonshire Yeomanry and "B" Squadron 144th Regiment Royal Armoured Corps were positioned in woods. To the left or west, "A" Squadron Sherbrooke Fusilier Regiment was located at a chateau courtyard broadside to the attack, where they had knocked firing positions through the stone walls.  The attack collapsed as the Canadian tanks destroyed two Tiger tanks, two Panzer IVs and two self-propelled guns in Wittman's force, while British tank fire destroyed three other Tigers. During the ambush, anti-tank shells—fired from either the British or Canadian tanks—penetrated the upper hull of Wittmann's tank, igniting the ammunition. The resulting fire engulfed the tank and blew off the turret. The destroyed tank's dead crew members were buried in an unmarked grave. In 1983, the German war graves commission located the burial site. Wittmann and his crew were reinterred together at the La Cambe German war cemetery in France.
In 2008 a documentary in the Battlefield Mysteries series examined the final battle. A historian, Norm Christie, interviewed participants; Rad Walters, Joe Ekins and Ken Tout, and from their testimony and the two German accounts pieced the final battle together. The Tigers left the cover of a hedge near Cintheaux at 12:30 in two prongs; one in the middle of the field with the other—including Wittman—moving slower on the right. The British 75mm armed tanks engaged the lead Tiger (Iriohn) hitting it in the transmission, bogies or track and it started going in circles trying to withdraw. Joe Ekins' tank hit the second Tiger on the right side and knocked it out. As the crew escaped and brought out their wounded, they watched another Tiger north of them go up in flames (Kisters). Iriohn partly withdrew but could not get away and was hit by Ekins—"the one that was mulling around." Wittmann signalled "Pull back!" He did not realize that a group of the Sherbrookes were immediately to his right, and in a volley they knocked out the two Tigers beside the road. The commander of the second Tiger recalled the position of Wittmann's tank and specifically the skewed turret. The tank blew up shortly afterwards. Survivors from Dollinger's tank passed by the wreck of Wittmann's tank shortly afterwards.

Speculation surrounding death
For such a junior officer, an unusual amount of speculation has surrounded Wittmann's death, both as to its cause and the party responsible. Agte states that "the English" could have possibly placed a bounty on him. This is contradicted by Allied records and the testimony of Allied troops involved that he was not singled out during the battle.

After the war, claims were made by or for the following units as being responsible for Wittmann's death: the 1st Polish Armoured Division, the 4th Canadian Armoured Division, the 144th Regiment Royal Armoured Corps, and the RAF Second Tactical Air Force.

Nazi propaganda reported that Allied aircraft struck Wittmann's tank, stating that he had fallen in combat to the "dreaded fighter-bombers". In a post-war account, French civilian Serge Varin, who took the only known photograph of the destroyed tank, claimed that he found an unexploded rocket nearby and that he saw no other penetration holes in the tank. Historian Brian Reid dismisses this contention as relevant RAF logs make no claim of engaging tanks in the area at that time. This position is supported by the men of Wittmann's unit who stated they did not come under air attack, and by British and Canadian tank crews who also dismissed any involvement by aircraft.

In a 1985 issue of After the Battle Magazine, Les Taylor, a wartime member of the 1st Northamptonshire Yeomanry, claimed that fellow yeoman Joe Ekins was responsible for the destruction of Wittmann's tank. Veteran and historian Ken Tout, a member of the same unit, published a similar account crediting Ekins. This became, for a time, the widely accepted version of events. According to Hart, Ekin's unit was positioned in a wood on the right flank of the advancing Tiger tanks. At approximately 12:47, they engaged them, halting the attack, and killing Wittmann.

Reid discusses the possibility that A Squadron of the Sherbrooke Fusilier Regiment, 2nd Canadian Armoured Brigade, positioned on the left flank of the advancing German tanks, was responsible instead. Commanded by Sydney Valpy Radley-Walters, the squadron's six 75 mm Shermans and two 17-pounder Sherman Fireflies were situated on the grounds of a chateau at Gaumesnil. The unit had created firing holes in the property's walls and, based on verbal testimony, engaged the advancing German tanks, including Tigers. Reid argues that due to the Canadians' proximity to the Germans, and the firing angle which precisely coincides with the tank round's entry hole in the Tiger, their troops more than likely destroyed Wittmann's tank. Reid supports this with H. Holfinger's account of the engagement. Holfinger was in a Tiger approximately  behind Wittmann and he said Wittmann's Tiger was destroyed at 12:55. Ekin's crew was credited with the destruction of 3 Tigers at 12:40, 12:47 and 12:52, Wittmann's tank being allegedly the one destroyed at 12:47. Considering Holfinger's account, Reid concludes that the Tiger destroyed at 12:47 could not be that of Wittmann; he also notes that the circumstances surrounding the fate of the Tiger destroyed at 12:52 exclude the possibility that it could have been Wittmann's.

Assessment as tank commander

Some historians and authors of the late twentieth-century found Wittmann's actions at Villers-Bocage impressive, describing his attack as "one of the most amazing engagements in the history of armoured warfare", "one of the most devastating single-handed actions of the war", and "one of the most devastating ambushes in British military history". Historian Stephen Badsey has stated that the ambush Wittmann launched has cast a shadow over the period between D-Day and 13 June in historical accounts.

With a record of 130 tanks destroyed, Wittman was Germany's top tank ace. Claims by Franz Kurowski over Kurt Knispel having a greater number are disputed.

Jim Stor, writing in "The Human Face of War" notes that Wittman's attack on the British regiment at Bocage went beyond just a bad day of tanks losses for the British. He states that the shock of losses to the British regiment had operational and strategic effect for the operation. 

German tank commander and historian  is not as impressed. In analyzing Wittmann's actions at Villers-Bocage, he called into question his tactical ability. Schneider states: "a competent tank company commander does not accumulate so many serious mistakes". He highlights how Wittmann dispersed his forces in a sunken lane with a broken down tank at the head of the column, thereby hampering his unit's mobility. The solitary advance into Villers-Bocage was heavily criticized as it breached "all the rules". No intelligence was gathered, and there was no "centre of gravity" or "concentration of forces" in the attack. Schneider argues that due to Wittmann's rash actions: "the bulk of the 2nd Company and Mobius 1st Company came up against an enemy who had gone onto the defensive". He calls Wittmann's "carefree" advance into British-occupied positions "pure folly", and says "such over hastiness was uncalled for." He concludes that had a properly prepared assault been launched involving the rest of his company, and the 1st Company, far greater results could have been achieved. Finally, Schneider opines that: "thoughtlessness of this kind was to cost [Wittmann] his life ... during an attack casually launched in open country with an exposed flank."

Historian Sönke Neitzel describes Wittmann as the "supposedly successful"  tank commander of World War II and attests to "hero worshiping" around Wittmann. According to Neitzel, numbers of successes, by highly decorated tank commanders, should be read with caution as it is rarely possible to determine reliably, in the heat of battle, how many tanks were destroyed by whom.

Historian Steven Zaloga credits Wittmann with around 135 tank kills and points out that he achieved 120 of these in 1943, operating a Tiger I tank on the Eastern Front. Having advantages both in firepower and in armor, the Tiger I was "nearly invulnerable in a frontal engagement" against any of the Soviet tanks of that time, and Wittmann thus could destroy opposing tanks from a safe distance. Zaloga concludes that "Most of the 'tank aces' of World War II were simply lucky enough to have an invulnerable tank with a powerful gun." German documents from 1944 state that Allied technology had caught up with the Tiger I and "no longer can it prance around, oblivious to the laws of tank tactics". Zaloga believes that Wittmann's fate reflected that new reality: after his transfer to France, his crew only lasted two months, and was destroyed either by a British medium tank, the up-gunned Sherman Firefly, or a standard 75mm-equipped Sherman. The 75mm's armour piercing round was more than enough to have penetrated his Tiger's thin rear upper deck armour from less than 150 m (500 feet) and all of the Sherbrooke-Fusilier's records were lost shortly after the battle when an American aircraft dropped a bomb on the vehicle that contained these documents.

Writing in 2013, British historian John Buckley criticised the accounts which many historians continue to provide of the fighting around Villers-Bocage. Buckley argued that by wrongly attributing the entire German success to Wittmann, "many historians through to today continue to repackage unquestioningly Nazi propaganda".

Awards
 Iron Cross (1939) 2nd Class (12 July 1941) & 1st Class (8 September 1941)
 Panzer Badge in Silver
 Knight's Cross of the Iron Cross with Oak Leaves and Swords
 Knight's Cross on 14 January 1944
 Oak Leaves on 30 January 1944
 Swords on 22 June 1944

In popular culture

Wittmann is often featured in books on the battles in Normandy. Several websites are dedicated to him, along with books by authors such as Patrick Agte and Franz Kurowski. The former is an author and publisher affiliated with the pro-Waffen-SS revisionist history group HIAG, while the latter is a prolific author who lauded decorated Waffen-SS men.

Cult status
Wittmann became a cult figure after the war thanks to his accomplishments as a "panzer ace" (a highly decorated tank commander) in the portrayal of the Waffen-SS in popular culture. Historian Stephen Hart said that "the Wittmann legend [has] become well-established" and "continues to stimulate huge public interest". Military historian Steven Zaloga refers to Wittmann as "the hero of all Nazi fanboys". He discusses the popular perception of a tank-versus-tank engagement as an "armoured joust"—two opponents facing each other—with the "more valiant or better-armed the eventual victor". Zaloga contends that the perception is nothing but "romantic nonsense". According to him, most successful tank commanders were "bushwackers", having a battlefield advantage rather than a technical one: a tank crew that could engage its opponent before the latter spotted it often came out on top.

Wittmann is featured by Kurowski in his 1992 book Panzer Aces, an ahistorical and hagiographic account of the combat careers of highly decorated German tank commanders. Smelser and Davies describe Kurowski's version of the war on the Eastern Front as "well-nigh chivalrous", with German troops "showing concerns for the Russian wounded, despite the many atrocities" of the Soviets against the Germans. In one of Kurowski's accounts, Wittmann takes out eighteen tanks in a single engagement, for which Sepp Dietrich, the commanding officer, presents him with an Iron Cross and inquires whether Wittmann has a request. Without hesitation, Wittmann asks for assistance for a wounded Russian soldier he has spotted. Many similar acts of "humanity" are present in the book, amounting to a distorted image of the German fighting men.

Notes

Citations

References

 
 

 

 
 
 
 
 
 
 
 
 
 
 
 

 
 
 
 
 
 
 
 
 
 
 
 Zuehlke, Mark (2017) "Heroes and Villains: Radley-Walters & Wittmann", Legion Magazine, August 8, 2017

Further reading

 

Propaganda legends
1914 births
1944 deaths
People from Neumarkt (district)
People from the Kingdom of Bavaria
SS-Hauptsturmführer
Panzer commanders
Recipients of the Knight's Cross of the Iron Cross with Oak Leaves and Swords
Waffen-SS personnel killed in action
Burials at La Cambe German war cemetery
Military personnel from Bavaria